Bogotá is the capital of Colombia.

Bogata or Bøgata may refer to:

Places

Romania
 Bogata, Mureș, a commune in Mureș County
 Bogata, a village in Dofteana Commune, Bacău County
 Bogata, a village in Călărași Commune, Cluj County
 Bogata, a village in Grădiştea Commune, Călăraşi County
 Bogata, a village in Baia Commune, Suceava County

United States
 Bogata, Texas, a city in Red River County

Rivers

Romania
 Bogata, a tributary of the Moldova in Suceava County
 Bogata (Olt), a left tributary of the Olt in Brașov County
 Bogata, an alternative name for the Vad, a tributary of the Someș in Cluj County

Other uses
 Bøgata, a street in Oslo, Norway
 Oleksandra Bogata, a Ukrainian swimmer in the 2003 World Aquatics Championships
 Bogata, an early locomotive on the Panama Canal Railway

See also
 Bogota (disambiguation)